The 2019 Rugby Europe Women's Championship was the 23rd edition of Rugby Europe's top division competition for women's national rugby union teams, and the eleventh such tournament for which the European Championship title was awarded.

The tournament was held from 23 February to 4 May 2019 as a knockout competition, with the four highest ranked teams in Europe not participating in the Women's Six Nations competing. For the first time the competition was not held in a single location - each match instead was hosted by the higher seeded team.  won the championship to take its fourth European title and third consecutive title and seventh overall.

Format

The format was a four team semifinal bracket, with the teams seeded 1 and 2 meeting the teams seeded 4 and 3 respectively. A final for the title was played between the two semifinal winners and a match for third place was played by the defeated semifinal teams.

Results

Semi-finals

3rd Place

Final

See also
 2018–19 Rugby Europe Women's Trophy
 Rugby Europe Women's Championship
 Women's international rugby union § 2019

References

2019
2019 rugby union tournaments for national teams
Championship
2018–19 in German rugby union
2019 in Dutch women's sport
2018–19 in Spanish rugby union